During World War II, around 200,000 ethnic Polish children as well as an unspecified number of children of other ethnicities were abducted from their homes and forcibly transported to Nazi Germany for purposes of forced labour, medical experimentation, or Germanization.

An aim of the project was to acquire and "Germanize" children with purportedly Aryan-Nordic traits, who were considered by Nazi officials to be descendants of German settlers who had emigrated to Poland. Those labelled "racially valuable" were forcibly Germanized in centres and then sent to German families and SS Home Schools.

An association, "Stolen Children: Forgotten Victims" (Geraubte Kinder – Vergessene Opfer e.V.), is active in Germany, representing victims of German kidnapping.

Background
In a well-known speech to his military commanders at Obersalzberg on 22 August 1939, Adolf Hitler condoned the killing without pity or mercy of all men, women, and children of Polish race or language.

On 7 November 1939, Hitler decreed that Heinrich Himmler, whose German title at that time was Reichskomissar für die Festigung deutschen Volkstums, would be responsible for policy regarding the population of occupied territories. The plan to kidnap Polish children most likely was created in a document titled Rassenpolitisches Amt der NSDAP.

On 25 November 1939, Himmler was sent a 40-page document titled (in English translation) "The issue of the treatment of population in former Polish territories from a racial-political view." The last chapter of the document concerns "racially valuable" Polish children and plans to forcefully acquire them for German plans and purposes:

On 15 May 1940, in a document titled (in German) Einige Gedanken ueber die Behandlung der Fremdenvoelker im Osten ("A Few Thoughts about the Treatment of Racial Aliens in the East"), and in another "top-secret memorandum with limited distribution, dated 25 May 1940", titled (in English translation) "The Treatment of Racial Aliens in the East", Himmler defined special directives for the kidnapping of Polish children. Himmler "also outlined the administration of incorporated Poland and the General Government, where Poles were to be assigned to compulsory labor, and racially selected children were to be abducted and Germanized."

Among Himmler's core points:
 In the territory of Poland, only four grade schools would remain, in which education would be strictly limited. Children would be taught to count only to 500, to write their own names, and that God commanded Poles to serve Germans. Writing was determined to be unnecessary for the Polish population.
 Parents who desired better education for their children would have to apply to the SS and police for a special permit. The permit would be awarded to children deemed "racially valuable". Those children would be taken to Germany to be Germanised. Even then, the fate of each child would be determined by the loyalty and obedience to the German state of his or her parents. A child determined to be "of little racial value" would not receive any further education.
 Annual selection would be made every year among children from six to ten years of age according to German racial standards. Children deemed adequately German would be taken to Germany, given new names and further Germanised.  The aim of the plan was to destroy "Polish" as an ethnic group, and leave within Poland a considerable slave population to be used up over the next 10 years. Within 15 to 20 years, Poles would be completely eradicated.

On 20 June 1940, Hitler approved Himmler's directives, ordering copies to be sent to chief organs of the SS, to Gauleiters in German-occupied territories in Central Europe, and to the governor of General Government, and commanding that the operation of kidnapping Polish children in order to seek Aryan descendants for Germanisation be a priority in those territories.

Himmler mused on initiating similar projects in German-occupied France. Hitler's Table Talk records him expressing his belief that "the French problem" would be best solved by yearly extractions of a number of racially healthy children, chosen from "France's Germanic population". He preferred they be placed in German boarding schools, in order to separate them from their "incidental" French nationality, and to make them aware of their "Germanic blood". Hitler responded that the "religious petit-bourgeois tendencies of the French people" would make it almost impossible to "salvage the Germanic elements from the claws of the ruling class of that country". Martin Bormann believed it to be an ingenious policy, noting it in the document record as a [sic] "sinister theory!".

Conditions of transfer

The conditions of transfer were very harsh, as the children did not receive food or water for many days. Many children died as a result of suffocation in the summer and cold in the winter. Polish railway workers, often risking their lives, tried to feed the imprisoned children or to give them warm clothes. Sometimes the German guards could be bribed with jewelry or gold to allow the supplies to go through, and in other cases they sold some of the children to Poles. In Bydgoszcz and Gdynia, Poles bought children for 40 Reichsmarks. In some places the German price for a Polish child was 25 zlotys.

The children were kidnapped by force, often after their parents had been murdered in concentration camps or shot as "partisans", including a handful of the children of Lidice.  These children would not be permitted to remain even with other living relatives. Some were purportedly from German soldiers and foreign mothers, and others were declared "German orphans" who had been raised by non-German families.  Indeed, orphanages and children's homes, along with children living with foster parents, were among the first groups targeted, in the belief that Poles deliberately and systemically Polonized ethnically German children.

Later the children were sent to special centres and institutions or to, as Germans called them, "children education camps" (Kindererziehungslager), which, in reality, were selection camps where their "racial values" were tested, their original metrics of birth destroyed, and their Polish names changed to German names, as part of Germanisation. Those children who were classified as "of little value" were sent to Auschwitz or to Treblinka.

Selection

The children were placed in special temporary camps of the health department, or Lebensborn e.V., called in German Kindererziehungslager ("children's education camps"). Afterwards they went through special "quality selection" or "racial selection" – a detailed racial examination, combined with psychological tests and medical exams made by experts from RuSHA or doctors from Gesundheitsamt (health department). A child's "racial value" would determine to which of 11 racial types it was assigned, including 62 points assessing body proportions, eye colour, hair colour, and the shape of the skull.

During this testing process, children were divided into three groups (in English translation):
 "desired population growth";
 "acceptable population growth"; and
 "undesired population growth".
The failures that could result in a child, otherwise fitting all racial criteria, into the second group included such traits as "round-headed" referring to the skull shape. Children could be declared the third group for tuberculosis, "degenerate" skull shape, or for "Gypsy characteristics".  A girl who was later identified by a small birthmark would have been rejected had the birthmark been much larger.

These racial exams determined the fate of children: whether they would be killed, or sent to concentration camps, or experience other consequences.  For example, after forcibly taking a child away from his or her parents, "medical exams" could be performed in secret and in disguise.

Many Nazis were astounded at the number of Polish children found to exhibit "Nordic" traits, but assumed that all such children were genuinely German children, who had been Polonized; Hans Frank summoned up such views when he declared, "When we see a blue-eyed child we are surprised that he is speaking Polish."  Among those children thought to be genuinely German were children whose parents had been executed for resisting Germanization.

German documentation
Once selected, the children between six and twelve were sent to special homes.  Their names were altered to similar-sounding German ones.  They were compelled to learn German and beaten if they persisted in speaking Polish. They were informed their parents were dead even if they were not.  Children who would not learn German or remembered their Polish origin were sent back to youth camps in Poland.  In some cases, the efforts were so successful that the children lived and died believing themselves to be Germans.

The authorities were reluctant to let the children be officially adopted, as the proceedings might reveal their Polish origin. Indeed, some children were maltreated when their adoptive parents learned that they were Polish. Adoption was also problematic because surveillance or more information might reveal problems with the child. When it was learned that Rosalie K's mother was epileptic, for instance, it was immediately concluded, despite the wishes of her German foster parents, that Germanization, education and adoption were therefore not justifiable. When adoptive parents demanded adoption certificates, such records were forged for them.

German medical experiments
Those children who did not pass harsh Nazi exams and criteria and who were therefore selected during the operation, were sent as test subjects for experiments in special centres. Children sent there ranged from eight months to 18 years. Two such centres were located in German-occupied Poland. One of them, Medizinische Kinderheilanstalt, was in Lubliniec in Upper Silesia – in this centre children were also subject to forced "euthanasia"; while the second was located in Cieszyn. Children were given psychoactive drugs, chemicals and other substances for medical tests, although it was generally known that the true purpose of those procedures was their mass extermination.

Murder of Zamość children in Auschwitz

At Auschwitz concentration camp 200 to 300 Polish children from the Zamość area were murdered by the Nazis by phenol injections. The child was placed on a stool, occasionally blindfolded with a piece of a towel. The person performing the execution then placed one of his hands on the back of the child's neck and another behind the shoulder blade. As the child's chest was thrust out a long needle was used to inject a toxic dose of phenol into the chest. The children usually died in minutes. A witness described the process as deadly efficient: "As a rule not even a moan would be heard. And they did not wait until the doomed person really died. During his agony, he was taken from both sides under the armpits and thrown into a pile of corpses in another room…  And the next victim took his place on the stool."

To trick the soon-to-be murdered children into obedience Germans promised them that they would work at a brickyard. However another group of children, young boys by the age of 8 to 12, managed to warn their fellow child inmates by calling for help when they were being killed by the Nazis: "Mamo! Mamo!" ('Mama! Mama!'), the dying screams of the children, were heard by several inmates and made an indelible haunting impression on them.'"

Post-war repatriation efforts
The extent of the program became clear to Allied forces over the course of months, as they found groups of "Germanized" children and became aware that many more were in the German population. Locating these children turned up their stories of forcible instruction in the German language and how the failures were killed. Teams were constituted to search for the children, a particularly important point when dealing with institutions, where a single investigator could only interview a few children before all the rest were coached to provide false information. Many children had to be lured into speaking the truth; as for instance complimenting their German and asking how long they had spoken it, and only when told that a nine-year-old had spoken German for four years, pointing out that they must have spoken before then, whereupon the child could be brought to admit to having spoken Polish.  Some children suffered emotional trauma when they were removed from their adoptive German parents, often the only parents they remembered, and returned to their biological parents, when they no longer remembered Polish, only German. The older children generally remembered Poland; ones as young as ten had forgotten much, but could often be reminded by such things as Polish nursery rhymes; the youngest had no memories that could be recalled.

Allied forces made efforts to repatriate them. However, many children, particularly Polish and Yugoslavian who were among the first taken, declared on being found that they were German. Russian and Ukrainian children, while not gotten to this stage, still had been taught to hate their native countries and did not want to return.  While many foster parents voluntarily brought forth well-cared-for children, other children proved to be abused or used for labour, and still others went to great efforts to hide the children.

After the war, The United States of America v. Ulrich Greifelt, et al., or the RuSHA Trial, the eighth of the twelve Nuremberg Trials, dealt with the kidnapping of children by the Nazis.  Many children testified, although many of their parents were afraid to let them return to Germany.  From 1947 to 1948, the Nuremberg Trials ruled that the abductions, exterminations, and Germanization constituted genocide.

Only 10 to 15 percent of those abducted returned to their homes.  When Allied effort to identify such children ceased, 13,517 inquiries were still open, and it was clear that German authorities would not be returning them.

Heuaktion

In a plan called "Heuaktion", described in a "top secret" memorandum submitted to German Interior Minister Heinrich Himmler on 10 June 1944,  Gottlob Berger – Chief of the Political Directing Staff (head of the SS main leadership office in Berlin), a co-author of Himmler's pamphlet Der Untermensch, and a promoter of the pamphlet Mit Schwert und Wiege (With Sword and Cradle) for the recruitment of non-Germans – proposed that the German 9th Army "evacuate" 40,000–50,000 children between 10 and 14 from the "territory of Army Group 'Centre'" to work for the Third Reich.

Heuaktion was not widely implemented, due in part perhaps to the following arguments against it: "The Minister [Himmler] feared that the action would have most unfavourable political consequences, that it would be regarded as abduction of children, and that the juveniles did not represent a real asset to the enemy's military strength anyhow.... The Minister would like to see the action confined to the 15–17 year olds." Between March and October 1944, however, 28,000 children between the ages of 10 and 18 were deported from Belarus for work in the German arms industry.

Statistics
Between 1940 and 1945, according to official Polish estimates, approximately 200,000 Polish children were abducted by the Nazis. William Rubinstein cites the figure of up to 200,000 Polish children kidnapped by Nazis. According to Dirk Moses' estimate, 20,000 children were abducted for such purposes from Poland, 20,000 from the Soviet Union, and 10,000 from Western Europe and Southeast Europe. Tadeusz Piotrowski in his book Poland's Holocaust states that 200,000 Polish children were kidnapped out of which only 15 to 20% were reclaimed by either parents or the Polish government after the war. According to Tara Zahra, the number of children taken from their parents includes 40,000 to 50,000 children taken as part of Heuaktion for forced labour from Belarus, 28,000 Soviet youth "under the age of eighteen" taken for labour by the Luftwaffe, "tens of thousands" of Polish, Czech, Slovenian and Silesian children taken during evacuations after which they ended up in orphanages and Hitler Youth camps, unspecified number of children taken by force from women working as forced labour in Germany, and 20,000–50,000 "deliberately kidnapped" in Eastern Europe. Additional non-German-speaking children were evacuated along with German civilians, while tens of thousands of foreign children were recruited as forced labourers or born to female forced labourers in Germany. Confusion between ethnic German children from Eastern Europe and non-German children was another factor that led to inflated estimates. The modern association "Stolen children. Forgotten victims" representing victims of this operation presented the following estimates as of 2018:
 Poland: 50,000–200,000 kidnapped children
 Heuaktion in Poland, Ukraine and Belarus: 40,000–50,000 kidnapped children
 Bohemia and Moravia: 1,000 kidnapped children
 Slovenia: 1,100 kidnapped children
Post-war estimates on kidnapped children vary depending on criteria used; Isabell Heinemann in the documentary "Kinderraub der Nazis. Die vergessenen Opfer" stated that her research team identified 20,000 Polish children kidnapped who passed the Germanization criteria and were integrated into the Lebensborn program. While Polish estimates, for example, include children taken under different conditions, such as those taken away forcefully from women working as forced labour in Germany. Precise numbers are difficult to ascertain and depend on classification of kidnapping and if one counts children born to parents used as forced labour.

Memorials
After the war, a memorial plate was made in Lublin dedicated to railway workers who tried to save Polish children from German captivity.

Remembrance

In 2017 the German broadcaster Deutsche Welle and Polish journalists from Interia.pl engaged in a remembrance project documenting history and fate of kidnapped children. Journalists visited institutions, archives and foundations, as well as victims who are still alive today. Numerous surviving victims have been interviewed presenting their attempts to trace back their origins, claim compensation or present their story. Together, as part of this series, over 40 articles and 23 video documentaries were produced, culminating in a book and a movie documentary which was presented by German state broadcaster ARD.

Notes

References
 Hrabar, Roman Z., Zofia Tokarz, and Jacek E. Wilczur. The Fate of Polish Children During the Last War.  Trans. Bogdan Buczkowski and Lech Petrowicz.  Rada Ochrony Pomników Walki i Męczeństwa.  Warsaw: Interpress, 1981.  .
 Milton, Sybil.  "Non-Jewish Children in the Camps".  Museum of Tolerance, Multimedia Learning Center Online. Annual 5, Chapter 2.  Copyright © 1997, The Simon Wiesenthal Center.   Accessed September 25, 2008.
 Richard C. Lukas, Did the Children Cry? Hitler's War against Jewish and Polish Children, 1939–1945. Hippocrene Books, New York, 2001
 Nuremberg Trials Project: Overview and Nuremberg Trial Documents Bibliography and Nuremberg Trial Resources – Nuremberg Trials Project: A Digital Document Collection at Harvard University Law School Library (HLSL). ["Contents of the Collection: The Nuremberg Trials collection fills some 690 boxes, with an average box containing approximately 1500 pages of text (for a total estimated at 1,035,000 pages). The three largest groups of documents are: trial documents (primarily briefs and document books for trial exhibits) for the twelve NMT trials and the IMT trial (280 boxes); trial transcripts for the twelve NMT trials and the IMT trial (154 boxes); and evidence file documents (the photostats, typescripts, and evidence analyses from which the prosecution, and occasionally defendants, drew their exhibits) (200 boxes). ... The HLSL collection also includes documents from the IMT hearings on criminal organizations and miscellaneous papers concerning the trials. Most of the documents are in both English and German (and occasionally other languages). ... In this project only the English language trial documents and trial transcripts will be presented, but the evidence file documents are usually in both English and German."]
 "The RuSHA Case: D. Kidnapping of Children of Foreign Nationality: 3. Polish Children" (inactive URL).  Cf.  D. Kidnapping of Children of Foreign Nationality: 3. Polish Children" (Internet Archive URL).  993–1028 in Trials of War Criminals Before the Nuernberg [sic] Military Tribunals Under Control Council Law No. 10.  © Mazal Library, n.d.  NMT04-C001. Nuernberg [sic] Military Tribunal, Vol. IV, pp. vii–viii: "The RuSHA Case".  . mazal.org.  Accessed September 15, 2008.  (Trial documents.) [Note: "The Trials of War Criminals before the Nuernberg Military Tribunals (NMT) differ from the Trial of the Major War Criminals before the International Military Tribunal (IMT) in a number of different ways...."]
 Zbrodnia bez kary… : eksterminacja i cierpienie polskich dzieci pod okupacją niemiecką 1939–1945 (Crime without penalty... : extermination and suffering of Polish children during the German occupation of 1939–1945) editor Kostkiewicz Janina, Jagiellonian University in Kraków, 2020, 

Poland in World War II
Germany–Poland relations
Nazi war crimes in Poland
Adoption history
Children in war
Anti-Slavic sentiment
Anti-Polish sentiment in Europe
Child abduction in Germany
Nazi war crimes
International adoption
Germanization